The Laguna Cartagena National Wildlife Refuge (Spanish: Refugio de Vida Silvestre de Laguna Cartagena) is a 1043-acre National Wildlife Refuge in Lajas, Puerto Rico. It is part of the Caribbean Islands National Wildlife Refuge Complex.

The present lagoon is a remnant of what was once a large open expanse of water and one of the most important freshwater habitats for migrating waterfowl and aquatic birds in Puerto Rico. Due to agricultural practices, about 90 percent of the lagoon is covered with cattail. Intensive cattle grazing and sugar cane production have greatly altered the original landscape.

These hills, geologically the oldest in the Caribbean, protect native forest with many endemic plant species. The area is a stopover for neotropical migrants and several species of waterbirds. The endangered yellow-shouldered blackbird and peregrine falcon have been reported on the refuge.

References

External links

 Refuge website

Lajas, Puerto Rico
National Wildlife Refuges in Puerto Rico
Protected areas established in 1989
1989 establishments in Puerto Rico